Robot Roller-Derby Disco Dodgeball is an arcade arena dodgeball video game developed by Erik Asmussen. The game was released on 19 February 2015 for Windows, Mac, and Linux.

Gameplay
In the game players control, from a first person perspective, a robot with one wheel. They can throw balls at other players to knock them out or score points and catch them to eliminate the thrower; more points can be earned through creative or skillful hits such as ricocheting the ball. Players can also deflect balls with the one they are currently holding. Movement in the game is dependent on the player's momentum, with travel continuing in a direction even if the player isn't holding a directional key.

The game has a Tron-like visual theme and disco music, and cosmetic items are available for customising the look of the player's robot. These items are tradeable for real currency on the Steam Workshop. The game has a number of different single and multiplayer modes and players are placed on leaderboards through playing.

Development
Robot Roller-Derby Disco Dodgeball was developed by Erik Asmussen who began development in July 2013, starting with the game's movement mechanics, saying that he enjoyed playing with the skating-like movement before any other aspects of the game had been developed.

The game was in a beta phase of development on Steam Early Access for a time before being released fully on 19 February 2015. Asmussen said that the Early Access period was important for the game's development, as he received feedback from players tweaking and testing the game's settings. He plans to include more features in the future, including a level editor and local multiplayer.

Reception
Josiah Renaudin of GameSpot gave the game a rating of 6/10, saying it was fun to play and commenting positively on visual style and number of game modes available. However he said that he felt the game didn't provide much incentive for continuing to play and that it was hard to correctly predict a throw's trajectory. Thomas Ella of Hardcore Gamer rated the game 4/5, describing it as "one of the best, most fun, well-crafted multiplayer games available right now" but expressed disappointment at the low number of online players.

References

External links

2015 video games
Dodgeball video games
Video games developed in the United States
Windows games
MacOS games
Linux games